Enceliopsis nudicaulis is a North American species of flowering plants in the family Asteraceae known by the common name nakedstem sunray, or naked-stemmed daisy.

Description

Blooming from May to August, the inflorescence is a solitary flower head atop a tall, erect peduncle. The fruit is a hairy achene about 1 cm in length.

Varieties
There are two recognized varieties of this species:
Enceliopsis nudicaulis var. corrugata, the Ash Meadows sunray – the rarer variety, which is probably endemic to Nevada in the vicinity of Ash Meadows in the Amargosa Desert; it is federally listed as threatened.
Enceliopsis nudicaulis  var. nudicaulis – found in most of species range

Distribution and habitat 
Enceliopsis nudicaulis is native to the western United States: Idaho, Colorado, Utah, Nevada, Arizona, and California including the Inyo Mountains–White Mountains and sky islands the Mojave Desert in California. It grows in desert, plateau, and montane habitats.

Uses 
It is sometimes used as an ornamental plant in dry areas.

References

External links
 Calflora Database: Enceliopsis nudicaulis (Naked stemmed daisy,  Nakedstem sunray)
Jepson Manual Treatment — Enceliopsis nudicaulis
United States Department of Agriculture Plants Profile: Enceliopsis nudicaulis
UC Calphotos gallery of Enceliopsis nudicaulis

nudicaulis
Flora of the Southwestern United States
Flora of the Great Basin
Flora of the California desert regions
Flora of Colorado
Flora of Idaho
Endemic flora of the United States
Plants described in 1873
Taxa named by Asa Gray
Taxa named by Aven Nelson
Flora without expected TNC conservation status